Mahito is a masculine Japanese given name. Notable people with the name include:

, Japanese noble
, Japanese gymnast
, Japanese voice actor
, Japanese actor and voice actor
, Japanese composer and orchestrator

Japanese masculine given names